Rainbow FC is the name of several football clubs:

 Rainbow FC (Cameroon)
 Rainbow FC (South Sudan)
 Rainbow FC (Bihar)